Karos may refer to:

Karos, Hungary, village in Borsod-Abaúj-Zemplén county
Zdzisław Karos (died 1982), Polish police officer

See also
Karros, surname
Karo (disambiguation)
Caros, given name